Lóeg, Loeg or LoEG can stand for:

 the companion of Cú Chulain, Láeg
 the Alan Moore-penned comic-series The League of Extraordinary Gentlemen

See also 
 Loeg Ningloron (The Gladden Fields), a location in J. R. R. Tolkien's Middle-earth